Medåker is a locality situated in Arboga Municipality, Västmanland County, Sweden with 224 inhabitants in 2010.

References 

Populated places in Västmanland County
Populated places in Arboga Municipality